Cathedral is a two-player abstract strategy board game in which two factions ("dark" and "light") vie for territorial supremacy within the bounds of a medieval city.  The game is produced by Chrisbo I.P. Holdings Limited in New Zealand.

History 

Cathedral was invented between 1962 and 1979 by Robert Moore (16 August 1942 – 19 June 1998), a pilot in the Royal New Zealand Air Force.  Inspiration for the game was provided by Christchurch Cathedral and its environs in Christchurch, New Zealand.  From the air, Moore was fascinated by the way the cathedral and neighbouring buildings intricately fit together, like pieces of a jigsaw puzzle.  He conceived of a game involving players trying to build interlocking buildings around a cathedral.

In 1979 Moore presented a prototype version of his game to Brightway Products, a New Zealand wooden toy and game company.  Two versions of the game were originally created: a "formal piece" using three-dimensional wooden models of mediaeval buildings and towers; and an "abstract piece" consisting of two-dimensional squares.  The formal piece proved more popular and is the only version produced today; in Standard, Tournalux (larger), and Grandelux (larger and higher quality) versions. The game was also recreated from as early as 1985 (from Mattel) in a more consumer accepted version in plastic moulded version with very highly detailed parts as well as a grided locking system added to the board.

It is generally accepted that the concept of the game is not subject to copyright. However, the name and specific wording of the rules and gameplay are copyright 1998 Chrisbo I.P. Holdings Limited.

Overview 

The idea of the game is to capture territory on the game board, allowing you to place all of your gamepieces while preventing your opponent from doing likewise.

Equipment 

Cathedral is played on a wooden board divided into a 10x10 grid.  The board is enclosed by turreted walls and represents a medieval city.  There are 29 pieces, all small abstracts of buildings.  One building is the Cathedral, painted grey.  The rest of the buildings are divided into 14 dark and 14 light pieces, one set for each player.  Notable is the fact that two of the pieces are configured differently between colors: the Academy and the Abbey. In the Standard and Tournalux versions of the game, the darker pieces are stained; in the Grandelux version they are made of a darker hardwood.  The pieces and the game board are covered with a lacquer finish.  A plastic version was produced for a short period in the mid 1980s.

Rules 

Whichever player is using the "light" pieces begins by placing the Cathedral anywhere within the play area, aligned with the squares.  Next the "dark" player places one of their game pieces on the board.  Play alternates between the two sides until one side is unable to make a move.  At this point, the other side attempts to place all of their remaining pieces in areas they have captured.

Players may capture territory within the city by completely enclosing it with their pieces alone, or with the help of the city walls.  Boundaries of these areas must be "wall to wall;" that is, if two of the surrounding pieces only touch on their corners, that's not a capture.  If the captured territory contains one and only one of the opponent's pieces or the cathedral, that piece may be removed and the opponent may no longer place pieces in that area.  An opponent's piece so removed can return to play at a later stage, but the cathedral will remain absent for the remainder of the game.  If the territory contains more than one piece (including the Cathedral), it is not captured and remains available for the opponent to use. Strategy: Use the largest pieces first, don't play into your captured space until you have no pieces left that will fit into the uncaptured areas.

The winner is the player who manages to place all of their pieces, while preventing their opponent from doing so.  If neither player is able to place all of their pieces, then the player whose remaining pieces would take up the smaller area is declared the winner.

When playing multiple games in a row, players alternate placing the Cathedral and moving first.  At the end of each game, each player gets a score based on the number of squares that their opponent's remaining buildings would occupy. Because of the different configuration in the two pieces mentioned above (in equipment), a good way to play multiple games is a 4-game set, with players playing each color twice, players alternating playing the Cathedral and moving first.

Solved/fix 

It is argued by ludologist Tom Lehmann that Cathedral is "broken", in that there is an opening strategy for the first player that cannot be countered by the second player. The suggested fix is for the second player to also place the Cathedral along with their first piece.

External links 
 Cathedral homepage
 Fix for Cathedral

Board games introduced in 1978
Abstract strategy games
New Zealand culture